

Universities

G8 Universities
G8 refers to the Group of Eight Universities of Foreign Languages and International Studies in China, who have the academic specialisation in foreign language teaching and international studies.

 Beijing Foreign Studies University, Beijing, China
 Beijing International Studies University, Beijing, China
 Shanghai International Studies University, Shanghai, China
 Tianjin Foreign Studies University, Tianjin, China
 Guangdong University of Foreign Studies, Guangzhou, Guangdong
 Xi'an International Studies University, Xi'an, Shaanxi
 Dalian University of Foreign Languages, Dalian, Liaoning
 Sichuan International Studies University, Chongqing, China

Universities with well-known foreign languages departments
 Qingdao University (Japanese and German), Qingdao, Shandong
 Nanjing University (German), Nanjing, Jiangsu

Other prominent foreign studies universities
These are the universities that provide Early Admission Scheme for high-achievers who intend to major in foreign language studies. 
Most of them are among the 36 leading universities in mainland China.

 Beijing Language and Culture University, Beijing
 China Foreign Affairs University, Beijing
 Beijing University of International Business and Economics, Beijing
 Communications University of China, Beijing
 Peking University, Beijing
 Renmin University of China, Beijing
 Fudan University, Shanghai
 Zhejiang University, Hangzhou
 Nankai University, Tianjin
 Harbin Institute of Technology, Harbin
 Ocean University of China, Qingdao
 Nanjing University, Nanjing
 Shandong University, Jinan
 Southeast University, Nanjing
 East China Normal University, Shanghai
 Heilongjiang University, Harbin
 Central China Normal University, Wuhan

Private and professional colleges 
 Jilin HuaQiao Foreign Languages Institute, Changchun, Jilin
 Heilongjiang International University, Harbin, Heilongjiang
 Guangxi University Of Foreign Languages, Nanning, Guangxi
 Hunan College of Foreign Studies, Changsha, Hunan
 Hebei Foreign Studies University, Shijiazhuang, Hebei

Secondary schools

 Ningbo Foreign Language School, Ningbo, Zhejiang
 Hangzhou Foreign Language School, Hangzhou, Zhejiang
 Jinan Foreign Language School, Jinan, Shandong
 Xiamen Foreign Language School, Xiamen, Fujian
 Wuhan Foreign Language School, Wuhan, Hubei
 Wenzhou Foreign Language School, Wenzhou, Zhejiang

Private education services
 New Oriental

References

Education in China
 
Language education